Kunal Bakshi is an Indian television actor. He has done lots of serials for almost all the leading channels.

Television
{{columns-list|colwidth=30em|
 Baal Veeras hubahu 
 Sadda Haq as Rana and Inspector Hooda 
 Kaali Chudail (episodic role)
 Meera as Ratan Singh
 Dekha Ek Khwaab
 Adaalat (episodic role)
 Encounter
 C.I.D. (episodic role)
 Bharat Ka Veer Putra – Maharana Pratap as Peer Mohammad
 Aahat (episodic role)
 Suryaputra Karn as Ashwathama
 Junoon – Aisi Nafrat Toh Kaisa Ishq
 SuperCops vs Supervillains (episodic role)
 Savdhaan India (episodic role)
 Laut Aao Trisha
 Ek Boond Ishq
 Emotional Atyachar (episodic role)
 Singhasan Battisi
 Badi Door Se Aaye Hai
 Kahi Suni (episodic role)
 Sankatmochan Mahabali Hanumaan as Yudhjeet
 Karmaphal Daata Shani as Indradev
 Mahakali — Anth Hi Aarambh Hai as Andhakasur
 RadhaKrishn as Indradev
 Shrimad Bhagwat Mahapuran as Ravana
 Devi Adi Parashakti as Indradev
}}
 Baalveer Returns''  as King Emaaya Egypt Evil

References

External links

Living people
Indian male television actors
Male actors in Hindi television
1986 births